Aphodius is a genus of beetles in the family Scarabaeidae. In most species both the adults and larvae are coprophagous (dung feeding) although some species have herbivorous or saprophagous larvae. Aphodius species typically dominate dung beetle communities in north temperate ecosystems. Most species are functionally classified as endocoprids, also known as dwellers, because the larvae live and feed within the dung pat itself.

Species
These 44 species belong to the genus Aphodius, including 21 extinct species.

 Aphodius beloni Mulsant & Godart, 1879
 Aphodius calichromus Balthasar, 1932
 Aphodius cardinalis Reitter, 1892
 Aphodius clypeatus Fischer von Waldheim, 1821
 Aphodius coniugatus (Panzer, 1795)
 Aphodius corallifer Koshantschikov, 1913
 Aphodius crux Wiedemann, 1823
 Aphodius elegans Allibert, 1847
 Aphodius fasciger Harold, 1881
 Aphodius fimetarius (Linnaeus, 1758)
 Aphodius foetidus (Herbst, 1783)
 Aphodius guangdongensis Maté, 2008
 Aphodius irregularis Westwood, 1839
 Aphodius marginatus Fischer von Waldheim, 1842
 Aphodius micros Walker, 1871
 Aphodius minatorius Péringuey, 1908
 Aphodius pedellus (Degeer, 1774)
 Aphodius pedrosi Wollaston, 1854
 Aphodius plasoni Käufel, 1914
 Aphodius reginae Král, 1997
 Aphodius spadix Schmidt, 1916
 Aphodius swaneticus Reitter, 1892
 Aphodius thoracicus Fischer von Waldheim, 1842
 † Aphodius aboriginalis Wickham, 1912
 † Aphodius anteactus Krell, 2000
 † Aphodius bosniaskii Handlirsch, 1907
 † Aphodius brevipennis Heer, 1862
 † Aphodius charauxi Piton, 1940
 † Aphodius cretaceous Nikolajev, 2008
 † Aphodius florissantensis Wickham, 1911
 † Aphodius granarioides Wickham, 1913
 † Aphodius helvolus Statz, 1952
 † Aphodius inundatus Wickham, 1914
 † Aphodius krantzi Heyden & Heyden, 1866
 † Aphodius laminicola Wickham, 1910
 † Aphodius mediaevus Wickham, 1914
 † Aphodius meyeri Heer, 1847
 † Aphodius praeemptor Wickham, 1913
 † Aphodius precursor Horn, 1876
 † Aphodius schlickumi Statz, 1952
 † Aphodius senex Wickham, 1914
 † Aphodius shoshonis Wickham, 1912
 † Aphodius theobaldi Krell, 2000
 † Aphodius vectis Krell, 2019

The species of the following genera were formerly classified in Aphodius:

 Acrossus Mulsant, 1842
 Agoliinus Schmidt, 1913
 Alloblackburneus Bordat, 2009
 Ballucus Gordon & Skelley, 2007
 Blackburneus Schmidt, 1913
 Calamosternus Motschulsky, 1859
 Caligodorus Gordon & Skelley, 2007
 Cephalocyclus Dellacasa et al., 1998
 Chilothorax Motschulsky, 1859
 Cinacanthus Schmidt, 1913
 Coelotrachelus Schmidt, 1913
 Colobopterus Mulsant, 1842
 Cryptoscatomaseter Gordon & Skelley, 2007
 Dellacasiellus Gordon & Skelley, 2007
 Dialytodius Gordon & Skelley, 2007
 Drepanocanthoides Schmidt, 1913
 Eupleurus Mulsant, 1842
 Flaviellus Gordon & Skelley, 2007
 Geomyphilus Gordon & Skelley, 2007
 Haroldiellus Gordon & Skelley, 2007
 Hornosus Dellacasa, Dellacasa & Gordon, 2015
 Irrasinus Gordon & Skelley, 2007
 Labarrus Mulsant & Rey, 1869
 Lechorodius Gordon & Skelley, 2007
 Liothorax Motschulsky, 1859
 Luxolinus Gordon & Skelley, 2007
 Maculaphodius Gordon & Skelley, 2007
 Melinopterus Mulsant, 1842
 Mendidius Harold, 1868
 Merogyrus Gordon & Skelley, 2007
 Neotrichonotulus Dellacasa et al., 2004
 Nialaphodius Kolbe, 1908
 Orodaliscoides Schmidt, 1913
 Oscarinus Gordon & Skelley, 2007
 Otophorus Mulsant, 1842
 Oxyomoides Dellacasa et al., 2016
 Pardalosus Gordon & Skelley, 2007
 Phaeaphodius Reitter, 1892
 Planolinellus Dellacasa & Dellacasa, 2005
 Planolinoides Dellacasa & Dellacasa, 2005
 Planolinus Mulsant & Rey, 1869
 Pseudagolius Schmidt, 1913
 Rugaphodius Gordon & Skelley, 2007
 Scabrostomus Gordon & Skelley, 2007
 Schaefferellus Gordon & Skelley, 2007
 Setodius Gordon & Skelley, 2007
 Stenotothorax Schmidt, 1913
 Strigodius Gordon & Skelley, 2007
 Tetraclipeoides Schmidt, 1913
 Teuchestes Mulsant, 1842
 Trichaphodioides Paulian, 1942
 Trichonotulus Bedel, 1911

References

Scarabaeidae
Scarabaeidae genera
Taxa named by Johann Karl Wilhelm Illiger